Marquette Airlines was an airline that operated regional flights in the midwestern United States from 1938 to 1940.

Marquette was founded in 1938 by Winston Weidner "Wink" Kratz, a 33-year-old pilot. It began scheduled service on the St. Louis - Cincinnati - Detroit route on May 4, 1938, with service four days a week, which soon expanded to six days a week, using Stinson Model A tri-motor aircraft. Marquette's line connected with the coast-to-coast route of Transcontinental & Western Air (TWA) at St. Louis and Dayton. TWA saw the airline as a potential competitor and initially opposed Marquette's application for an operating certificate.

TWA reached an agreement to acquire Marquette in October 1939, subject to Civil Aeronautics Authority (CAA) approval. The CAA approved the acquisition later that year following a supplemental agreement to reduce the purchase price. 

TWA took over operation of the Marquette Airlines route on August 15, 1940, allowing TWA to serve Cincinnati and Detroit for the first time, and offer direct service from Cincinnati to Pittsburgh and New York. TWA replaced Marquette's Stinson trimotors with newer Douglas DC-2s. The Civil Aeronautics Board (successor of the CAA) announced on October 18, 1941, that TWA could formally acquire Marquette, despite the airlines having already practically merged at that time.

Tata Sons Ltd., the predecessor of Air India, acquired five of Marquette's Stinson aircraft in 1941 following the requisition of its larger aircraft for war purposes.

Destinations 

Cincinnati, Ohio
Dayton, Ohio
Detroit, Michigan
St. Louis, Missouri
Toledo, Ohio

See also 
 List of defunct airlines of the United States

References

Defunct airlines of the United States
1930s establishments in the United States